Victoria Koleva (Виктория Колева) (born 20 February 1960) is a contemporary Bulgarian actress. She has over 120 roles in theatre productions. In 2004 she was awarded an Icarus theatre award for Best Leading Actress for the role of Kostanda in Mother-in-Law by Anton Strashimirov (directed by Marius Kurkinski). Victoria Koleva won her first award in 1988 - Shumen award for Best Young Actress.

Significant Roles

Plovdiv Drama Theatre(1999–2007)
The Art of Comedy by L. Pirandello, directed by M. Kurkinsky … The teacher
The Bear by A. Chekhov, directed by M. Kurkinsky … Popova; Plovdiv Award for theatre
Mother-in-law by A. Strashimirov, directed by M. Kurkinsky … Kostanda
Romeo and Juliet by W. Shakespeare, directed by G. Stoev … Lady Capulet
The Brothers Karamazov by F. Dostoevsky, directed by S. Radev … Hohlakova
A Midsummer Night's Dream by W. Shakespeare, directed by P. Kaukov … Titania
Blood Wedding by Federico García Lorca, directed by M. Kurkinsky … The Mother
European Capital of Culture, Weimar, Germany (1999)
Life with an Idiot by Victor Erofeyev, directed by E. Bonev … She
Between Worlds by Éric-Emmanuel Schmitt, directed by Zdravko Mitkov … Dr. S.
Derezon Theatre Alliance française (1997–1998)
Miss Julie by A. Strindberg, directed by Emil Bonev … Miss Julia
Plovdiv Drama Theatre(1991–1997)
Who's Afraid of Virginia Woolf? by E. Albee, directed by H. Zerovski … Honey
Sexual Perversity in Chicago by David Mamet, directed by N. Lambrev
The Last Yankee by Arthur Miller, directed by B. Chakrinov … Patricia
Vieux Carré by T. Williams, directed by A. Gadjalov … Mrs. Wier
Shoumen Drama Theatre (1988–1991)
Electra, My Love by Laszlo Gyurk], directed by B. Pankin … Electra; Shoumen Award for young actress
The Secret Dinner of Deacon Levski by Stefan Tsanev, directed by B. Pankin … Karavelova
Even a Wise Man Stumbles by A. Ostrovsky, directed by A. Katz … Kleopatra Lvovna; Russia
Razgrad Drama Theatre (1986–1988)
The Lark by Jean Anouilh, directed by H. Minchev … Joan of Arc
Love Boulevards by Stefan Tzanev, directed by Boris Pankin … Maya
Manufacture Theatre
Two-Character Play by T. Williams, directed by A. Draganova … The Sister
Woyzeck by Georg Buchner, directed by H. Mintchev … Мariе

External links
Victoria Koleva's website
Plovdiv Drama Theatre

1960 births
Living people
Bulgarian stage actresses
People from Ruse, Bulgaria
Date of birth missing (living people)
20th-century Bulgarian actresses
21st-century Bulgarian actresses